Andrew Little assembled a shadow cabinet after he was elected Leader of the Labour Party in New Zealand.  He composed this of individuals who acted for the party as spokespeople in assigned roles while he was Leader of the Opposition (2014–17). As the Labour Party formed the largest party not in government, this Frontbench team was as a result the Official Opposition of the New Zealand House of Representatives.

November 2014

Little announced his first shadow cabinet line-up on 24 November 2014, shortly after his election as leader.

November 2015

Little reshuffled his shadow cabinet on 30 November 2015, one year into his leadership. Media reporting noted the demotions of Nanaia Mahuta and the former leader David Cunliffe. Another former leader, Phil Goff, was moved to the lowest ranking, but this reflected his reduced Parliamentary activity during his campaign for the Auckland mayoralty.

December 2016

Little announced a reshuffled shadow cabinet on 16 December 2016, reflecting the retirements of Phil Goff and David Shearer, the imminent retirement of David Cunliffe, and the election to Parliament of Michael Wood.

March 2017

A further reshuffle took place on 8 March 2017. This reflected Annette King's announcement of her retirement from politics at the next election and resignation as deputy leader, the election of Jacinda Ardern as her successor, and the return to Parliament of Raymond Huo following Ardern's win in the Mount Albert by-election and consequent vacation of her list seat.

References

New Zealand Labour Party
Little, Andrew
2015 in New Zealand
2014 establishments in New Zealand
2017 disestablishments in New Zealand